Ninì Falpalà is a 1933 Italian "white-telephones" comedy film directed by Amleto Palermi and starring Dina Galli, Renzo Ricci and Elsa De Giorgi. It is based on a play by Augusto Novelli, and was shot at the Caesar Film studios in Rome.

Synopsis
Two elderly variety actors, struggling for work, decide to attract attention by staging the suicide of one of them.

Cast
 Dina Galli as Ninì Falpalà 
 Renzo Ricci as Leone 
 Hilda Springher as Vane 
 Elsa De Giorgi as La figlia di Torrazza 
 Franco Coop as Fanfara 
 Aristide Baghetti as Torrazza 
 Enzo Gainotti
 Rocco D'Assunta
 Claudio Ermelli
 Mario Gallina

References

Bibliography 
 Roberto Chiti & Roberto Poppi. I film: Tutti i film italiani dal 1930 al 1944. Gremese Editore, 2005.

External links 
 

1933 films
Italian comedy films
1933 comedy films
1930s Italian-language films
Films directed by Amleto Palermi
Italian black-and-white films
1930s Italian films